Nahum Tschacbasov (1899–1984;) also known as Nahum Lichter, and Nahum Tschakbassoff, was a Russian-born American painter, printmaker, graphic artist, poet, businessperson, and educator. He used many names including Nahum Lichter, Nathan Richter, H. H. Richter, Hanathan Richter, and Nathan Lichterman. Tschacbasov was a member of "The Ten", a group of expressionist artists.

Early life 
He was born on August 31, 1899, in Baku, Russian Empire, into a Jewish family of Georgian descent. In 1905, when he was a young child, his family moved to Chicago because of pogroms. There are varying stories as to why he used different names either due to a forged passport used for immigration; to avoid paying child support; and/or because he was a con-man. He served in the United States Navy from 1917 to 1919.

Career 
In the 1920s and 1930s, he worked as a businessman in Chicago where he made a fortune. His second marriage was to his secretary Esther. Tschacbasov moved to France in 1932 to 1933, where he studied painting with Adolph Gottlieb, Marcel Gromaire, and Fernand Léger.

When the family returned to the United States the Tschacbasov family moved to Brooklyn. Early in his career he had a good relationship with artists Milton Avery, Raphael Soyer, Moses Soyer, Isaac Soyer, William Gropper, David Burliuk, and Philip Evergood. In 1935, he was part of a group exhibition at the Gallery Secession alongside Mark Rothko, Gottlieb, and the other artist members of "The Ten".

He taught at the Art Students League of New York. Additionally he taught painting at his own art school in Woodstock, New York; and taught at the Marxist-focused John Reed Club School. His notable art students include Fritzie Abadi, James F. Walker, and his future wife Irene Zevon.

In 1982, Southampton College Press published his illustrated poetry book, Machinery of Fright.

Death and legacy 
He died in February 1984 at New York University Hospital. He is buried in New Montefiore Cemetery.

It was estimated he had made some 7,000+ paintings and prints. His work is included in museum collections including the Smithsonian American Art Museum, the Metropolitan Museum of Art, the Brooklyn Museum, the Jewish Museum, and the Whitney Museum of American Art.

In 2013, he had a posthumous solo exhibition curated by Marina Kovalyov at the National Arts Club, as part of the 11th Annual Russian Heritage Month.

Personal life 
Tschacbasov was a member of the Communist Party.

His second wife was Esther Sorokin, who died in 1961; his third wife was painter and his former student, Irene Zevon. He had two children. His daughter was Alexandra (or Sasha, Sondra), she was the second wife of writer Saul Bellows; together they had son Adam Bellow. Bellows book Herzog (1964) was influenced by his divorce to Alexandra. According to Alexandra in 2011, her father sexually abused her starting around age 11.

Publications

References

External links 
 , which shows photos
 Audio: Nahum Tschacbasov, published by The New York Public Radio (NYPR) Archive Collections
 Nahum Tschacbasov slides, 1936–1963 at Archives of American Art, Smithsonian Institution

1899 births
1984 deaths
Artists from Baku
American people of Russian-Jewish descent
Emigrants from the Russian Empire to the United States
Artists from New York City
Poets from New York (state)
Art Students League of New York faculty
American people of Georgian-Jewish descent
American communists